Florian Lampert (July 8, 1863 – July 18, 1930), was a Republican member of the United States House of Representatives serving Wisconsin's 6th District.

Career
Florian Lampert was born on July 8, 1863 in West Bend, Wisconsin, he moved to Oshkosh, Wisconsin with his widowed mother in 1875. There he engaged in the retail shoe business (1880–1893), served as city comptroller (1893–1896), sheriff of Winnebago County (1897–1898), and city commissioner of Oshkosh (1914–1918). In 1918 he was elected as a Republican to fill the vacancy in the 65th Congress caused by the death of James H. Davidson. He was thereafter elected to a regular term in the United States Congress, and held the position through six successive terms (November 5, 1918 – July 18, 1930).

As a representative, Lampert devoted much time and effort to the handling of applications for veterans' pensions. He was also active in securing public improvements for his district and served on the committee that framed much of the early aviation legislation.

Family
He was married May 4, 1885, to Mary C. Vetter, to whom seven children were born, five sons and two daughters. All of the sons served their country in World War I. The eldest, Lt. Col. J. G. B. Lampert, died in France, on January 6, 1919.

Death
He died at Chicago Heights Hospital of injuries sustained in an automobile accident while returning to Oshkosh to open the campaign for the Congressional election of 1930 to the 72nd Congress. His remains are interred at Riverside Cemetery in Oshkosh.

See also

List of United States Congress members who died in office (1900–49)

References

Wisconsin Historical Society
University of Wisconsin Digital Collection; Wisconsin Blue Book 1929

External links

Florian Lampert Bio at Wisconsin Historical Society

1863 births
1930 deaths
People from West Bend, Wisconsin
Road incident deaths in Illinois
Wisconsin sheriffs
Republican Party members of the United States House of Representatives from Wisconsin